This is an episode list for the British television series Z-Cars. The series was aired on BBC One, between 1962 and 1978. Many of the episodes are now missing from the BBC archives.

Series overview

Series 1 (1962)

Series 2 (1962–1963)

Series 3 (1963–1964)

Series 4 (1964–1965)

Series 5 (1965)

Series 6 (1967–1971)

Series 7 (1971–1973)

Series 8 (1973–1974)

Series 9 (1974–1975)

Series 10 (1976)

Series 11 (1977)

Series 12 (1978)

References

Lists of British crime television series episodes